Erhan Kartal (born 1 March 1993) is a Turkish footballer who plays as a right-back for Ankara Keçiörengücü.

Club career
He made his Süper Lig debut for Denizlispor against Gençlerbirliği on 2 May 2010.

International career
Kartal represented Turkey at the 2010 UEFA European Under-17 Football Championship.

References

External links
 
 
 
 

1993 births
People from Milas
Living people
Turkish footballers
Turkey youth international footballers
Association football fullbacks
Association football defenders
Denizlispor footballers
Kasımpaşa S.K. footballers
Şanlıurfaspor footballers
Alanyaspor footballers
Gaziantep F.K. footballers
Adana Demirspor footballers
Samsunspor footballers
Altay S.K. footballers
Tuzlaspor players
Ankara Keçiörengücü S.K. footballers
Süper Lig players
TFF First League players
TFF Second League players